Tore Rismo (born 29 January 1961) is a retired Norwegian football midfielder.

Hailing from Sørreisa, he lived with his family in Belgium from age 12 to 15, then returned home and started playing senior football for Sørreisa IL. After one season in FK Mjølner he studied at the University of Tromsø and played for Tromsø IL between 1984 and 1990. He helped win the 1986 Norwegian Football Cup.

References

1961 births
Living people
People from Sørreisa
Norwegian footballers
FK Mjølner players
Tromsø IL players
Norwegian First Division players
Eliteserien players
Norwegian expatriates in Belgium
Association football midfielders
Sportspeople from Troms og Finnmark